Mónica Núñez (born 12 October 1976) is a Dominican former professional boxer who competed from 2000 to 2005. She challenged once for the IWBF super-middleweight title in 2004 and once for the WIBA middleweight title in 2005.

Núñez began her career by knocking out Claribel Ferreira in three rounds, on 9 June 2000, at Santo Domingo.

Three decision wins followed, including one over previously undefeated Marylin Hernandez, before she fought for the first time at the "Teo Cruz" coliseum, also in Santo Domingo. She knocked out Damaris Vizcaino in three rounds there, on 20 September 2002. Her next fight was also held there, as she beat Diana Garcia by a four-round decision on December 19 of the same year.

Following that victory, Núñez took the decision of leaving the Dominican Republic, probably looking for better fights and payoffs against better known opponents. She moved to the United States, settling in Irvington, New Jersey. New Jersey was a logical choice for Nunez when it came down to choosing a state where to live in the United States for her: both New Jersey and New York have a large group of Dominican people, which would mean good crowd backing for Nunez whenever she fought in the US, particularly around the New England area.

In her American debut, she lost, however, being handled her first professional defeat at the hands of Roselin Morales, who defeated Nunez by a four-round split decision on 23 October 2003, in Allentown, Pennsylvania. The Morales fight was, of course, Núñez's first fight abroad.

On 4 December, she knocked out Shadina Pennybaker in two rounds, also in Allentown.

Núñez travelled to Bermuda for her first fight of 2004, defeating Teresa Perozzi there by a six-round majority decision on 12 June.

After one more victory, Núñez was given her first world championship try, for the WIBF's world Super Middleweight championship. On 30 July, she fought Laila Ali in Louisville, Kentucky, being defeated by a ninth-round knockout by the world champion.

Offered a world title try at the Middleweight division, Núñez immediately accepted and she went down in weight to face the WIBA world champion Leatitia Robinson, on 11 February, 2005. She lost by knockout in the first round, in a fight held at Atlanta, Georgia.

Núñez announced her plans to keep boxing in the Super Middleweight division soon after the fight with Robinson was over.

On 17 July, Nunez lost to Ann Wolfe by a seventh-round knockout in Lula, Mississippi.

Professional boxing record

References

External links
 

1976 births
Living people
Dominican Republic women boxers
Middleweight boxers
Super-middleweight boxers
20th-century Dominican Republic women
21st-century Dominican Republic women